{{DISPLAYTITLE:Chi1 Hydrae}}

Chi1 Hydrae (χ1 Hydrae) is a binary star in the equatorial constellation of Hydra. It originally received the Flamsteed designation of 9 Crateris before being placed in the Hydra constellation. Based upon an annual parallax shift of 22.8 mas as seen from Earth, it is located about 143 light years from the Sun. It is visible to the naked eye with a combined apparent visual magnitude of 4.94.

The two components of this system appear to have equal masses of 1.93 times the mass of the Sun. The pair circle each other with an orbital period of 7.55 years with an eccentricity of 0.35.

References

F-type main-sequence stars
Binary stars
Hydra (constellation)
Hydrae, Chi1
4314
096202
054204
Crateris, 9
Durchmusterung objects